Premier American Bank was a US bank that operated in Miami, Florida until it was closed by the Florida Office of Financial Regulation on January 22, 2010. The Federal Deposit Insurance Corporation (FDIC) assumed control, then entered into a purchase and assumptions agreement with American Premier Bank, National Association, a subsidiary of Bond Street Holding. It provided consumer and business banking services to communities throughout Florida.

In July 2011, the bank changed its name to Florida Community Bank N.A.

Through acquisitions and organic growth, Florida Community Bank continued to expand its branch network and now services three of the top four largest Metropolitan Statistical Areas (MSA) in Florida: Orlando, Miami and West Palm Beach.

In addition to the purchase of Premier American Bank, Bond Street Holdings also acquired seven additional Florida-based banks which include Peninsula Bank, Sunshine State Community Bank, First National Bank of Central Florida, Cortez Community Bank, Coastal Bank, First Peoples Bank and Great Florida Bank. The eight acquired banks have joined and now form the new Florida Community Bank.

References

Banks based in Florida
Banks established in 2001
Companies based in Miami
Defunct banks of the United States
2001 establishments in Florida
2010 disestablishments in Florida
American companies established in 2001
American companies disestablished in 2010
Banks disestablished in 2010